Roman Buess (born 21 September 1992) is a Swiss footballer who plays as a forward for FC Winterthur.

Club career

FC Basel
Born in Basel, Buess started his football with the youth teams of SV Muttenz. He moved to FC Basel in 2003 and played for various FC Basel youth teams, including the U-18 team that won the Swiss championship in 2010. After that date he was member of the U-21 squad and at the beginning of the 2011–12 season he was in training with the FC Basel first team. He made his first team debut in the 4–0 away win in the 2011–12 Swiss Cup game against FC Eschenbach. He played his league debut in the 2–1 home win in a match against Thun on 2 May 2012. Despite having played only in one league game, at the end of the 2011–12 season he won the Double, the League Championship title and the Swiss Cup with Basel. However, during the season, he had continued playing regularly with the U-21 team.

Loan to Aarau and Locarno
To gain regular playing experience Buess was loaned to FC Aarau in the Swiss Challenge League for the 2012–13 Season. Aarau finished the season as Challenge League champions and were promoted. Buess played 17 games in the league and 4 in that seasons Swiss Cup. However, the loan contract ran out and thus Buess returned to Basel and was again loaned out, this time to FC Locarno. Buess played in 31 of the 36 games, but Locarno finished bottom of the Challenge League table and were relegated.

Wohlen
Buess's contract with Basel expired and therefore he joined FC Wohlen on a free transfer. Wohlen started well in the season and led in the league table from the second up until the 26th match day, when they were overtaken by Servette FC and the later Challenge League champions FC Lugano. Buess finished the season as team top scorer and with 11 goals, in 7th position of the best scorer list in the League. With 12 final passes he ended the season as the league's top assist giver.

Thun
At the beginning of the 2014–15 Swiss Super League season Buess transferred to FC Thun.

Career statistics

Titles and honours
Basel
 Swiss champion at U-16 level: 2007–08
 Swiss Cup winner at U-16 level: 2007–08 
 Swiss champion at U-18 level: 2009–10
 Swiss Super League champion: 2011–12
 Swiss Cup winner: 2011–12

Aarau
 Challenge League champion: 2012–13

International
 FIFA U-17 World Cup World Champion: 2009

External links
 Profile at FC Basel 
 Profile at Swiss Football League

References

Living people
1992 births
Association football midfielders
Swiss men's footballers
Switzerland youth international footballers
Swiss Super League players
Swiss Challenge League players
SV Muttenz players
FC Basel players
FC Aarau players
FC Locarno players
FC Wohlen players
FC Thun players
FC St. Gallen players
FC Winterthur players
Footballers from Basel